Ellerslie is a suburb of the city of Auckland, in the North Island of New Zealand. Ellerslie lies seven kilometres to the southeast of the city centre, close to State Highway 1.

Administratively, Ellerslie forms part of the Ōrākei Local Board, which also includes the suburbs of Orakei, Mission Bay, Kohimarama, Saint Heliers, Glendowie, St Johns, Meadowbank and Remuera. To the west, Ellerslie borders on the One Tree Hill area and Cornwall Park. Largely a residential suburb, the area is arguably best-known as the site of Auckland's main horse-racing venue, Ellerslie Racecourse, as well as the original site of the Ellerslie Flower Show. (From 2008 the Flower Show moved to Christchurch in the South Island.)

History

The Development of Ellerslie
The suburb was named by early local politician and entrepreneur Robert Graham, after his father's home in Elderslie (sic) in Renfrewshire, Scotland. Graham arrived in Auckland in October 1842 as an assisted immigrant from Scotland.

In 1848 Graham bought two blocks of land where, after his marriage to Sophia Swann in 1852, he built the ‘Ellerslie House’ as a family homestead. Adjacent to this home was a track along which Mrs Graham was in the habit of riding her horse every morning, now a street called Ladies Mile. Many of the local streets bear names of Graham family members.

In 1873 the railway from Auckland was extended to reach Ellerslie. It is likely that Graham developed part of his property as the 'Ellerslie Zoological Gardens' because of this development. The gardens included flower beds, fountains, a bandstand, dance pavilion and a zoo. This made Ellerslie a popular leisure centre for Aucklanders. In 1886 much of the Graham farm was subdivided for housing. Horse races were already being held in Ellerslie since 1857, but in 1886 the Racing Club acquired a permanent site from the Graham family, including the Zoological Gardens. The racecourse had its own railway station for race days, and was a prominent feature of the Ellerslie area up until its heyday in the 1920s and 1930s.

Next to Ellerslie Train Station a small township developed, servicing not only the local residents but also the race day crowds. As the 20th century progressed the surrounding rural land disappeared and Ellerslie became absorbed into suburban Auckland. The building of the Southern Motorway was to both strengthen the strategic location already created by the railway, as well as weaken the local cohesion of the area because of the physical divide the motorway created.

The original local authority was Ellerslie Town District, established in 1908. The Borough of Ellerslie was formally declared on 1 April 1938. In 1989 Ellerslie was amalgamated into Auckland City Council. The area has seen strong population growth in the recent past, growing 32% in the inner Ellerslie area between 1991 and 2001.

Ellerslie is now a desirable suburb with convenient access to the city centre for commuting (via rail and bus links) and ready access to the nearby Southern Motorway for road users. The town centre is pleasant with good services, while retaining a sense of community. Housing in the area is well planned and close to a number of attractive parks, such as Michaels Avenue Reserve and Waiatarua Reserve.

Singing Caves
Māori gave the name ‘Waiatarua’ to the site which later became the Ellerslie Racecourse. Translated as "two songs" the name refers to a waiata or song that emanated from caves. It was believed that this ‘singing’ was created by water and air blowing from a larger cave into a smaller passage, making a vibrating sound. In the 1960s a new grand stand was constructed at the racecourse and the caves were filled with concrete to create a seal. This was not wholly successful, and it is said that the singing could still be heard coming from the caves.

The Town Centre

The Ellerslie Town Centre is on Main Highway near where it intersects with the Ellerslie-Panmure Highway. The construction in the 1960s of the Southern Motorway cut Ellerslie off nearby Greenlane, resulting in a downturn in trade and many empty shops. However, in the 2000s, Ellerslie recovered with a strong upturn in employment in the nearby business parks on the southern side of the motorway (connected to the area with a pedestrian overbridge). The overbridge was the location of the opening scene of the New Zealand film Once Were Warriors (film). In 2006, the overbridge was transformed with a ‘Bridge of Memories’ mosaic storyboard portraying different landmark buildings, houses (past and present), and images from the local schools.

The Ellerslie Meteorite
At 9.00 am on 12 June 2004 a meteorite crashed through the roof of the home of the Archer family in Ellerslie. The meteorite landed into the living room of the house, bouncing off the couch and hitting the ceiling. The home owners heard an explosion and saw dust everywhere, but nobody was hurt. This meteorite is officially named the Auckland Meteorite, despite tradition demanding that a meteorite is named after the nearest post office. However, an Ellerslie Meteorite had already fallen in Australia. The rock weighs 1.3 kg and is estimated to be around 4,600 million years old.  It is the ninth meteorite found in New Zealand and the first to hit a home. According to Auckland University experts, a meteorite that crashes through a roof is a very rare event. This meteorite received world-wide attention and an American collector offered the Archer family $50,000 for the space rock. The Archers declined this offer, favouring the public display of the rock in New Zealand, so that anyone interested could view it. The meteorite has been since on display in the Auckland Museum, where it can be seen in the Origins Gallery.

The Ellerslie Flower Show
The Ellerslie International Flower Show was first held in Ellerslie in 1994 at the Ellerslie Racecourse. This is New Zealand’s annual garden show. After 3 years in Ellerslie, it moved to the Auckland Botanic Gardens in Manurewa, Auckland.  In 2008 the Flower Show moved again, this time to Hagley Park in Christchurch.

Demographics
Ellerslie comprises four statistical areas. Ellerslie Central, East and South are primarily residential. Ellerslie West, which is separated from the rest of the suburb by the Auckland Southern Motorway, is commercial/industrial.

Residential area

The residential area had a population of 9,039 at the 2018 New Zealand census, an increase of 453 people (5.3%) since the 2013 census, and an increase of 1,101 people (13.9%) since the 2006 census. There were 3,123 households, comprising 4,395 males and 4,647 females, giving a sex ratio of 0.95 males per female, with 1,671 people (18.5%) aged under 15 years, 1,890 (20.9%) aged 15 to 29, 4,488 (49.7%) aged 30 to 64, and 990 (11.0%) aged 65 or older.

Ethnicities were 64.9% European/Pākehā, 7.0% Māori, 5.9% Pacific peoples, 28.8% Asian, and 3.8% other ethnicities. People may identify with more than one ethnicity.

The percentage of people born overseas was 39.7, compared with 27.1% nationally.

Although some people chose not to answer the census's question about religious affiliation, 46.9% had no religion, 36.7% were Christian, 0.2% had Māori religious beliefs, 3.8% were Hindu, 1.5% were Muslim, 2.7% were Buddhist and 3.5% had other religions.

Of those at least 15 years old, 3,141 (42.6%) people had a bachelor's or higher degree, and 522 (7.1%) people had no formal qualifications. 2,184 people (29.6%) earned over $70,000 compared to 17.2% nationally. The employment status of those at least 15 was that 4,491 (61.0%) people were employed full-time, 912 (12.4%) were part-time, and 213 (2.9%) were unemployed.

Commercial/Industrial area

Ellerslie West had a population of 147 at the 2018 New Zealand census, an increase of 3 people (2.1%) since the 2013 census, and an increase of 48 people (48.5%) since the 2006 census. There were 51 households, comprising 72 males and 75 females, giving a sex ratio of 0.96 males per female. The median age was 32.4 years (compared with 37.4 years nationally), with 24 people (16.3%) aged under 15 years, 36 (24.5%) aged 15 to 29, 78 (53.1%) aged 30 to 64, and 9 (6.1%) aged 65 or older.

Ethnicities were 59.2% European/Pākehā, 4.1% Māori, 4.1% Pacific peoples, 30.6% Asian, and 6.1% other ethnicities. People may identify with more than one ethnicity.

The percentage of people born overseas was 49.0, compared with 27.1% nationally.

Although some people chose not to answer the census's question about religious affiliation, 49.0% had no religion, 34.7% were Christian, 2.0% were Hindu, 2.0% were Muslim, 6.1% were Buddhist and 2.0% had other religions.

Of those at least 15 years old, 54 (43.9%) people had a bachelor's or higher degree, and 9 (7.3%) people had no formal qualifications. The median income was $52,300, compared with $31,800 nationally. 39 people (31.7%) earned over $70,000 compared to 17.2% nationally. The employment status of those at least 15 was that 93 (75.6%) people were employed full-time, 15 (12.2%) were part-time, and 3 (2.4%) were unemployed.

Local government
Ellerslie had a local government like other suburbs of Auckland. The local government was called Ellerslie Borough Council. It started in 1938 and eventually merged into Auckland City Council in 1989 and then merged into Auckland Council in November 2010.

Mayors during Ellerslie Borough Council
Horace James White, 1938–1956
Lloyd Elsmore, 1956–1962
Alan Trevor Bell, 1962–1974
William Edgar Brewster, 1974–1980
William "Bill" James Cann, 1980–1981
Leon Clarence Leicester, 1981–1989

Landmarks and features

The Ellerslie Race Course
 

The Ellerslie area has been known as the centre for horseracing since New Zealand’s first race meeting was organised there in 1842. The property was first used as farmland by Robert Graham, who was a supporter of racing. He later developed both the Alexandra Park Racecourse and the Ellerslie Racecourse. In 1873, Graham sold both racecourses to the Auckland Racing Club. The Auckland Jockey Club bought around 36 hectares (90 acres) in 1872. Today, the club owns around 72 hectares (180 acres) and race meetings are regularly held at the race course, including the New Zealand Derby and the Auckland Cup, the main races at the summer meeting. The racecourse is also home to a golf driving range and a nine-hole pitch and putt. In recent years, associated activities like fashion shows and socialising have become as important as watching the races.

Notable buildings
 Christ Church – This wooden gothic Anglican church was opened in 1883 in Ladies Mile. Its most significant feature is a full set of stained glass windows gifted to the congregation by the English firm of Clayton and Bell.
 Former Ellerslie Post Office – The post office was designed in 1909 by John Campbell. He modelled the building on the post offices in Mount Eden and Kingsland. The post office operated here until the privatisation of New Zealand Post in the late 1980s.
 Former Southern Cross Picture Theatre – This cinema was opened in 1925 and represented an exciting change in socialising for the people of Ellerslie. In the 1970s it was converted into squash courts.
 Former Municipal Offices – The Ellerslie Town District purchased the land on the corner of Ramsgate St and Main Highway in 1926 for the construction of its municipal buildings. The Ellerslie Borough Council was based in these offices until it merged with Auckland City in 1989.
 Arborfield – This two-story wooden Italianate house on the corner of Ramsgate st. and Main Highway was the residence of Lieut. Col Charles Dawson (18th Royal Irish Regiment), Chairman of the Mount Wellington Road Board and Master of the Pakuranga Hunt.
 Ellerslie War Memorial Hall Community Centre – This building was constructed in 1989 after fundraising by local groups and is used as a centre for performing arts. The Ellerslie servicemen who were killed or wounded in World War I and World War II are recognised in the Roll of Honour in the foyer of the War Memorial Hall.
Ellerslie supermarket

Parks and reserves
The Ellerslie Domain – The Ellerslie Domain is centrally located in Ellerslie and has sport facilities for tennis and rugby. Several sporting associations use the domain for their training, including the Ellerslie Eagles who compete in the Auckland Rugby League.

Michaels Avenue Reserve – The Michaels Avenue Reserve is a huge open green space used for sports and recreation activities. The reserve has an interesting array of plants and wildlife and a wetland is present in its north corner. The reserve has a playground for children and grounds for cricket and soccer. The Ellerslie Recreation Centre is located within the reserve, with a gymnasium which hosts various indoor sports.

Celtic Crescent Reserve – This reserve focuses on children, who can play on the adventure playground. The wider community can enjoy both passive and active recreation.

Sport and recreation
Ellerslie is home to several sporting clubs, including Ellerslie AFC who compete in the Lotto Sport Italia NRFL Division 1 and the Ellerslie Eagles who compete in Auckland Rugby League competitions.

Ellerslie is also the home of Ellerslie Bowling Club Established in 1911 Home to former British Empire Games Gold Medalist Robert Lang McDonald who attended the Ellerslie Primary School in early 1940s.

Education
The main primary school in the area is Ellerslie School, a primary and intermediate school (years 1–8), that was founded in 1877.

The above schools are coeducational. Rolls are as of 

Other secondary schools serving the local population are One Tree Hill College, St Peter’s College and Baradene College of the Sacred Heart.

Libraries
The residents and ratepayers of Ellerslie are entitled to free library membership at all of the  library branches of Auckland City Libraries. There is no branch located in Ellerslie, but the nearest public libraries are the Remuera library and the Panmure library. The Ellerslie Toy Library in Leicester Hall is a branch of the Toy Library Federation of New Zealand. The Ellerslie Toy Library relies on membership fees and donations to operate.

See also
 Ellerslie Racecourse
 Ellerslie Flower Show

References

External links
 Movie Ellerslie Meteorite
Photographs of Ellerslie held in Auckland Libraries' heritage collections.

Suburbs of Auckland
Populated places established in 1908
1908 establishments in New Zealand
Ōrākei Local Board Area